One-derful Records was an independent R&B and soul label based in Chicago. Founded by George Leaner (June 1, 1917 – September 18, 1983) in 1962, One-derful was one of the few black-owned labels in Chicago until its demise in 1968. The label is most known for the release of "Shake a Tail Feather" by the Five Du-Tones in 1963. Other artist on the label included the Sharpees, McKinley Mitchell, Alvin Cash, and Harold Burrage. A few subsidiary labels were launched: Mar-V-Lus, M-Pac, Halo, and Midas Records.

History 
A native of Mississippi, George Leaner relocated to Chicago with his family. His uncle, Al Benson, became an influential disc jockey in Chicago. After serving in the army during World War II, Leaner began working at sister's Groove Record Shop and became an assistant to blues producer Lester Melrose in 1946. In 1947, Leaner and his brother Ernie Leaner (1921 – 1990) joined M.S. Distributors and two years later Chord Distributing Company. In 1950, they went into recording, producing Little Walter and Muddy Waters at Monroe Passis' Parkway Records. That year Ernie founded a distribution company, United Distributors, which George worked at as a junior partner in the operation.

George Leaner launched One-derful in 1962 after McKinley Mitchel brought him a demo. Leaner created an A&R and production team with songwriter Andre Williams who he met working at United and musician Monk Higgins. He hired writers Otis Hayes, Eddie Silvers, and Larry Nestor. Along with creating the label, there was also a studio, Tone Recordings, in the One-derful building at 1827 S. Michigan Ave. United Distribution, which handled records from not only One-derful but other local and national labels, was located in the building as well. Musicians who recorded at the studio include Mighty Joe Young, Syl Johnson, Lonnie Brooks and the Jackson 5 recorded. Larry Blasingaine and his band Larry & the Hippies were the backing band for many One-derful sessions.

The label's debut single "The Town I Live In" by McKinley Mitchell reached #8 on the R&B chart. The next year, "Shake a Tail Feather" by the Five Du-Tones reached #51 on the Billboard Hot 100 and #28 on the Hot R&B Singles chart. Despite having some chart success, many of the artists on the label didn't receive royalties and the label struggled to generate profits. Attempting to capitalize off the Five Du-Tones popularity, a Five Du-Tones Revue Tour was formed which included the Du-Ettes, the Exciters, and Johnny Sayles, but it wasn't financially successful. After the label folded in 1968, Ernie Leaner and his nephew Tony Leaner formed the short-lived Toddlin' Town Records.

After Ernie Leaner died in 1990, his children inherited One-derful and its assets. They've organized and maintained an archive of more than 700 masters. One of those masters is a rare 1963 recording of "A Wonderful Thing (Love)" by a band called The Rockmasters. It featured Eddie Levert who went on to become an R&B sensation with the 70's and 80's era trio the O'Jays. After Michael Jackson's death in 2009, they discovered a master of the Jackson 5's recording of "I'm A Big Boy Now" ("Big Boy") from a July 1967 session which predated their Steeltown recording of "Big Boy" in November 1967.

Selected discography

References 

American independent record labels
Rhythm and blues record labels
Soul music record labels
Record labels established in 1962
Record labels disestablished in 1968
Defunct record labels of the United States
Music of Chicago
Companies based in Chicago